Tereza Trefná (born 18 December 1984) is a Czech professional racing cyclist. She competed in the 2013 UCI women's road race in Florence.

References

External links

1984 births
Living people
Czech female cyclists
Place of birth missing (living people)